Anila or Anil (Sanskrit: अनिल  "wind") is one of the Vasus in Hinduism, gods of the elements of the cosmos. He is equated with the wind god Vāyu, Anil being understood as the name normally used for Vāyu when numbered among the Vasus.

References

Hindu gods